The 380s decade ran from January 1, 380, to December 31, 389.

Significant people

References